Tatyana Aleksandrovna Grachova (born 23 February 1973 in Sverdlovsk) is a Russian volleyball player. She was a member of the national team that won the silver medal in the Sydney 2000 Olympic Games.  Also  competed in 1996 Summer Olympics.

External links
sports-reference.com

1973 births
Living people
Sportspeople from Yekaterinburg
Russian women's volleyball players
Russian expatriate sportspeople in Turkey
Olympic volleyball players of Russia
Volleyball players at the 1996 Summer Olympics
Volleyball players at the 2000 Summer Olympics
Olympic silver medalists for Russia
Eczacıbaşı volleyball players
Olympic medalists in volleyball
Medalists at the 2000 Summer Olympics
Russian Presidential Academy of National Economy and Public Administration alumni